Kate Blacker (born 1955) is a British artist.

Kate Blacker was born in 1955, and studied at the Camberwell School of Art and the Royal College of Art.

Her work is in the permanent collection of the Tate Gallery.

References

1955 births
Living people
20th-century British women artists
21st-century British women artists
Alumni of Camberwell College of Arts
Alumni of the Royal College of Art